Neil McNeil (November 23, 1851 – May 25, 1934) was the Roman Catholic Archbishop of Vancouver from 1910 to 1912 and Roman Catholic Archbishop of Toronto from 1912 to 1934.

Early life
McNeil was born in Hillsborough, Inverness County, Nova Scotia. He attended Propaganda College in Rome.

Career
In 1879, McNeil was ordained as a priest. In 1880 he was appointed vice-rector of College of St. Francis Xavier in Antigonish, Nova Scotia, and had risen to rector by the end of his service in 1891. He was pastor in Arichat and D'Escousse, Nova Scotia before becoming Vicar Apostolic of Western Newfoundland (St. George's) and Titular Bishop of Nilopolis in 1895.

In 1904, McNeil was appointed Bishop of St. George's, Newfoundland.

From 1910 to 1912, McNeil was Archbishop of Vancouver, British Columbia. After only two years, he became Archbishop of Toronto, Ontario, where he served from 1912 to 1934.

Shortly after being appointed as Archbishop, NcNeil was charged with completing St. Augustine's Seminary and the Canadian Catholic Church Extension Society created by his predecessor Fergus Patrick McEvay. 

Under McNeil, thirty more parishes were established, including those with non-English speaking immigrants in Toronto. He lobbied for fair taxation for Catholic schools.

McNeil founded the Federation of Catholic Charities when, in 1927, Toronto's umbrella Federation for Community Service refused to continue to fund Roman Catholic charitable institutions.

McNeil died in 1934, while serving as Archbishop of Toronto. He is buried at St. Augustine's Seminary.

Legacy
Under his leadership, the China Mission Seminary, later renamed the Scarboro Foreign Missionary Society, and the Newman Club were established.

Neil McNeil Catholic High School in Toronto was named in his honour.

References

1851 births
1934 deaths
20th-century Roman Catholic archbishops in Canada
Roman Catholic archbishops of Toronto
Canadian people of Scottish descent
Burials at St. Augustine's Seminary
Roman Catholic archbishops of Vancouver
People from Inverness County, Nova Scotia
Roman Catholic bishops of Corner Brook and Labrador